Grahame Davies LVO (born 1964) is a poet, author, editor, librettist, literary critic and former journalist. He was brought up in the former coal mining village of Coedpoeth near Wrexham in north east Wales.

Education
After gaining a degree in English Literature at Anglia Ruskin University, Cambridge, he qualified as a journalist with the Thomson Organisation at Newcastle-upon-Tyne. In 1997, he was awarded a doctorate by the University of Wales for his study, written in Welsh, of the work of R. S. Thomas, Saunders Lewis, T.S. Eliot and Simone Weil, whom he identified as part of an anti-modern trend in Western culture in the 20th Century.

Work
His career as a journalist and producer between 1986 and 2012 brought him a number of Welsh and industry awards.
In 1997, his first volume of poetry, Adennill Tir (Barddas), a book arising from the 10 years he spent in Merthyr Tydfil in the south Wales Valleys, won the Harri Webb Memorial Prize.

In 1999, his study of Wales and the anti-modern movement, Sefyll yn y Bwlch (University of Wales Press, 1999), the product of his doctoral research, was published. It went "straight to the front rank of criticism of our day," according to the critic Dr Dafydd Glyn Jones (Barn), and was described as "a signal book" by the critic Dr Angharad Price (New Welsh Review). In 2000, he co-edited Oxygen (Seren), a bilingual anthology of Welsh poets aged under 45.

In 2001, his second volume of poetry, Cadwyni Rhyddid (Barddas), appeared. It went to a second edition within a few months of publication, won the Wales Arts Council's 2002 Book of the Year award at the Hay on Wye Festival of Literature, together with a prize of £3,000. In 2002, Seren Press published his literary anthology, The Chosen People, which details the relationship of the Welsh and the Jewish people as reflected in literature.

Also in 2002, he edited a 160-page edition of the Bulgarian literary magazine Plamak (“Flame”) dedicated to Welsh literature, the first such anthology of Welsh writing in the Balkans. In 2002 Ffiniau/Borders appeared from Gomer press, a bilingual volume of poetry jointly with Elin ap Hywel.

In 2003, he chaired the panel of judges for the Welsh Book of the Year Awards. The first prize of £5,000 went to Jerry Hunter's Llwch Cenhedloedd. In 2004 his first novel Rhaid i Bopeth Newid was published by Gomer. It was longlisted for the £10,000 Book of the Year prize, 2005, and was described by Lord Dafydd Elis-Thomas in the Welsh poetry periodical Taliesin as 'the first post-national novel.' Also in 2004, his selection of Welsh poetry in Asturian translation appeared in Spain from Kêr ar Mor press under the title Nel país del borrina (The Country of the Clouds). In 2005, his selection of Welsh poetry in Galician translation appeared under the title of No país de la brétema from VTP Editorial.

He was a board member of the Welsh Academi from 2005-2011 and was the Welsh language editor of Poetry Wales magazine for several years until 2002. He won the vers libre prize in the National Eisteddfod in 1994, the sonnet prize in 2004 and 2016 and the Welsh Academi's Stomp competition in 2001. His work has been translated into several languages, including English, German, Latvian, Maltese, Bulgarian, Polish, Asturian and Galician, and is widely anthologised, appearing in publications as diverse as The Times, The Times Literary Supplement, Poetry London, the Literary Review in America, and the Yearbook of Welsh Writing in English. His poem 'Departed' was Poem of the Week in The Guardian.

He is a frequent contributor of articles and reviews to journals such as Poetry Wales, Barn, Taliesin, Planet and New Welsh Review, and his poetry is on the syllabus for school pupils in Wales. He was a regular columnist with Barddas. He reads regularly at festivals and venues, including the Berlin Poesiefestival, the National Eisteddfod, the Llangollen International Eisteddfod, several times at the Hay on Wye Festival of Literature and at the Royal Festival Hall in London. He has represented Wales at literary events in Europe, United States and Canada, and frequently appears on television and radio. As a literary critic he has chaired the panel of judges for the £10,000 2004 Book of the Year Award, and has also adjudicated other major competitions such as the John Tripp Award for Spoken Poetry and the National Eisteddfod's 2006 and 2011 Literary Medal Competitions. He is Vice President of Goodenough College in London and was an Honorary Research Fellow in Cardiff University. He has carried out many major commissions as a librettist for classical composers, including Sir Karl Jenkins and Paul Mealor.

Selected publications
 Adennill Tir (Cyhoeddiadau Barddas, 1997)
 Meddwl a’r Dychymyg Cymreig, Y: Sefyll yn y Bwlch: Cymru a’r Mudiad Gwrth-Fodern – Astudiaeth o Waith T.S. Eliot, Simone Weil, Saunders Lewis ac R.S. Thomas (University of Wales Press, 1999)
 Cadwyni Rhyddid (Cyhoeddiadau Barddas, 2002)
 Rhaid i Bopeth Newid (Gwasg Gomer, 2004)
 Achos (Cyhoeddiadau Barddas, 2005)
 Everything Must Change (Seren Press, 2007)
 Real Wrexham (Seren Press, 2007)
 The Dragon and the Crescent (Seren Press, 2011)
 Lightning Beneath the Sea (Seren Press, 2012)
 Alcemi Dwr / Alchemy of Water (Gwasg Gomer, 2013)
 Real Cambridge (Seren Press, 2021)

Contributed to:
 Oxygen – Beirdd Newydd o Gymru / New Poets from Wales (editor with Amy Wack) (Seren Press, 2000)
 Trosiadau / Translations: Ffiniau / Borders (with Elin ap Hywel) (Gwasg Gomer, 2002)
 The Chosen People – Wales and the Jews (editor) (Seren Press, 2002)
 The Big Book of Cardiff (edited with Peter Finch) (Seren Press, 2005)
 Gwyl Y Blaidd: The Festival of the Wolf (co-editor) (Parthian, 2006)
 Poems of Love and Longing (Pont, 2008)
 25/25 Vision. Welsh Horizons across 50 years (Institute of Welsh Affairs 2012)
 Poems for R.S. A Centenary Celebration (Hay Festival Press 2013)
 Encounters with R.S. (H'mm Foundation, 2013)
 Fesul Gair (Gomer, 2014)
 Dodos and Dragons (Aberystwyth University, 2016)
 The Old Red Tongue, (Francis Boutle, 2017)
 Argyfwng Hunaniaeth a Chred; Ysgrifau ar Athroniaeth J.R.Jones (Y Lolfa, 2017)
 Poems from Cardiff (Seren, 2019)
 Arrival at Elsewhere (Against the Grain, 2020)

Awards 

 1994 Vers Libre Prize at the National Eisteddfod of Wales
 1997 Harri Webb Memorial Poetry Prize
 1998 Welsh Arts Council Writer's Bursary Award 
 2001 Winner, Stomp, National Eisteddfod of Wales
 2002 Welsh Arts Council Book of the Year
 2004 Longlist for Book of the Year
 2004 Cerdd Deyrnged, National Eisteddfod of Wales
 2004 Fellowship of Goodenough College, London
 2004 Academi Bursary Award
 2007 Academi Bursary Award (second award)
 2008 Honorary Research Fellowship, Cardiff University
 2009 Ruth Howarth Literature Award
 2010 Honorary D.Litt. Anglia Ruskin University
 2011 Literature Wales Bursary
 2016 Sonnet prize, National Eisteddfod of Wales
 2017 Poem Suitable for Song prize. National Eisteddfod of Wales
 2020 Lieutenant of the Royal Victorian Order (LVO)

References

1964 births
Living people
Welsh poets
Welsh writers
People from Wrexham County Borough
People from Wrexham